Dins is the debut studio album by American rock band Psychic Ills. It was released on February 7, 2006, by the Social Registry.

Track listing

References

2006 debut albums
Psychic Ills albums
The Social Registry albums